Ken Campbell (born 21 April 1949) is a Canadian former medley swimmer. He competed in two events at the 1968 Summer Olympics. Campbell later competed at the 1970 British Commonwealth Games with the Canadian Team, where he won the silver medal for swimming in the 200m individual medley.

References

External links
 

1949 births
Living people
Canadian male medley swimmers
Olympic swimmers of Canada
Swimmers at the 1968 Summer Olympics
Commonwealth Games medallists in swimming
Commonwealth Games silver medallists for Canada
Swimmers at the 1970 British Commonwealth Games
People from West Vancouver
Sportspeople from British Columbia
Medallists at the 1970 British Commonwealth Games